The 2015 Australian Formula Ford Series was an Australian motor racing series open to Formula Ford and Formula Ford 1600 cars. The series was sanctioned by the Confederation of Australian Motor Sport (CAMS) with the Formula Ford Association Inc appointed as the Category Manager. It was the second Australian Formula Ford Series to be staged following the withdrawal of national championship status from the Australian Formula Ford Championship at the end of 2013.

The series was won by Cameron Hill, driving a Mygale SJ10a.

Race calendar

The series was contested over six rounds with three races per round.

Categories
Cars competed in two categories: 
 Formula Ford - for Ford Duratec engined cars
 Formula Ford 1600 - for Ford Kent engined cars

Points system
Points were awarded within each category on a 20-16-14-12-10-8-6-4-2-1 basis to the first ten finishers in each race. In addition, one point was awarded to the driver achieving the fastest lap time in qualifying in each category in each round.

Series standings

Australian Formula Ford Series

Australian Formula Ford 1600 Series

References

External links
 Formula Ford Association Inc.

Australian Formula Ford Series
Formula Ford